Alabama Agricultural and Mechanical University (Alabama A&M or AAMU) is a public historically black land-grant university in Normal, Huntsville, Alabama. Founded in 1875, it took its present name in 1969. AAMU is a member-school of the Thurgood Marshall College Fund and is accredited by the Southern Association of Colleges and Schools. Alabama Agricultural and Mechanical University Historic District, also known as Normal Hill College Historic District, has 28 buildings and four structures listed in the United States National Register of Historic Places.

History

Teacher and schoolmaster William Hooper Councill won approval for his plan for the Huntsville State Normal School for Negroes, established by an act of the Alabama State Legislature in 1875. The school opened on May 1, 1875, at a church on Eustis Street, with instruction for 61 teaching students overseen by Principal Councill, assisted by Rev. Alfred Hunt. By 1878, the state appropriation increased from $1,000 to $2,000 and the school expanded its enrollment and curriculum.

In 1881, the faculty pooled money from their salaries to purchase  on West Clinton Street. In 1885 the school, now with around 180 students, changed its name to State Normal and Industrial School of Huntsville, after the earlier addition of programs for sewing, printing, carpentry, mattress making and gardening. By 1890, the school site became known as Normal, Alabama, and a post office was established. In 1891, the school was designated as a land-grant college through legislative enactment under the terms of the Morrill Act of 1890. In 1896, its name was changed to The State Agricultural and Mechanical College for Negroes. In 1919, the school became the State Agricultural and Mechanical Institute for Negroes. In 1948 it was renamed the Alabama Agricultural and Mechanical College. AAMU became fully accredited by the Southern Association of Colleges and Schools in 1963. In June 1969, the school adopted its current name,Alabama Agricultural and Mechanical University.

The new millennium saw the construction of the West Campus Complex, the erection of the 21,000-seat Louis Crews Stadium, the renovations of buildings and the moving of athletic programs to the Southwestern Athletic Conference (SWAC). The School of Engineering and Technology facility was built in 2002, and the Ph.D. program in Reading and Literacy was established. Andrew Hugine was approved by the Board of Trustees as the 11th president on June 18, 2009. In 2015, the Board of Trustees approved out-of-state scholarships for the Fall 2016 semester. The scholarships are contingent on prospective students meeting various academic qualifications.

Campus

The campus grounds were designed by the Olmsted Brothers firm. The J.F. Drake Memorial Learning Resources Center was renovated in 2002, adding over 15,000 square feet (1,400 m2), an interactive Distance Learning Auditorium, conference, study and class rooms, lounges, and computer lab. The State Black Archives Research Center and Museum is located in the James H. Wilson Building, a national registered historical structure. On the third floor, the University Archives contains a collection of AAMU-related papers, paperwork, letters, and photos. 
Louis Crews Stadium is the sixth largest stadium in Alabama. Elmore Gymnasium is home to the basketball teams, and was once rated as one of the toughest places for opponents to play. 

In 1994, the Mamie Foster Student Living/Learning Complex was erected. Groundbreaking was held for the School of Business facility in 1995 and Louis Crews Stadium and Ernest L. Knight Complex Residence Hall construction began. The Engineering and Technology building known as Bond Hall was completed in 2002 and opened for classes in January 2003. The Normal Historic Preservation Association was incorporated on April 15, 2009, to help preserve and protect the Alabama A&M University National Historic District. The campus is served by the Bulldog Transit Shuttle bus system. A new 600-bed residence hall was constructed and opened for students January 2018, and construction planning of a new Event Center was approved by the Board of Trustees in September 2019.

Academics
The university awards 41 Baccalaureate, 23 Master's, one EdS, and four PhD degrees.  A selective honors program is available for academically exceptional undergraduate students.

Colleges and schools
 College of Agricultural, Life and Natural Sciences
 College of Business and Public Affairs
 College of Education, Humanities, and Behavioral Sciences
 College of Engineering, Technology and Physical Sciences
 School of Graduate Studies

Faculty
 20:1 student-faculty ratio
 Fewer than 40 students in 86 percent of courses
 348 faculty members across all undergraduate, graduate and professional programs

Students
 From 44 states and 11 foreign countries
 6,108 students, 1,521 first time freshmen; 3.01 average GPA (Fall 2018).
 42 percent first-time college students
 Middle 50th percentile on ACT: 17–18
 93 student clubs and organizations
 75 percent student participation in community service projects

National Space Science and Technology Center
The National Space Science and Technology Center (NSSTC) is a joint research venture between NASA, Alabama A&M and six other research universities of the state of Alabama, represented by the Space Science and Technology Alliance. The aim of the NSSTC is to foster collaboration in research between government, academia, and industry.

Alabama Cooperative Extension System
The Smith-Lever Act of 1914 established The Alabama Cooperative Extension System. The system provides educational outreach to the citizens of Alabama on behalf of the state's two land grant universities: Alabama A&M University and Auburn University. The system employs more than 800 faculty, professional educators, and staff members operating in offices in each of Alabama's 67 counties and in nine urban centers covering the major regions of the state. In conjunction with the Alabama Agricultural Experiment Station, the system also staffs six extension and research centers located in the state's principal geographic regions. Since 2004, "Alabama Extension" has functioned primarily as a regionally based system in which the bulk of educational programming is delivered by agents operating across a multi-county area and specializing in specific fields. County extension coordinators and county agents work with regional agents and other extension personnel to deliver services to clients within their areas.

Tuition and financial aid 
In the 2017-2018 award year, 3,701 Alabama A&M University students received financial assistance from Pell Grants, totaling $18,323,395.

Student life

Student activities
The Office of Student Activities and Leadership Development (OSALD) provides services, programs and co-curricular experiences that provide students with opportunities to develop skills, improve leadership competencies, and enrich their college experience. OSALD has oversight of and provides assistance to several student-led organizations:

 Programs and Activities Council
 Student Government Association
 National Pan-Hellenic Council
 Social Greek Council
 Student Publications

Other student organizations

AAMU Marching Maroon & White (marching band)
The Dancin' Divas (marching band danceline)
Fabulous Flags (marching band color guard)
AAMU Cheerleaders
AAMU Gospel Choir
AAMU Royal Court
Sigma Tau Epsilon professional fraternity Rho chapter
Phi Beta Lambda business fraternity, Xi Xi chapter
Eta Kappa Tau Engineering and Technology Fraternity, Inc. - Alpha chapter
Alpha Phi Omega service fraternity, Pi Epsilon chapter
Nu Rho Sigma fine arts fraternity, Alpha Alpha chapter
Sigma Alpha Iota music fraternity for women, Theta Zeta chapter
Tau Beta Sigma honorary band sorority, Theta Iota chapter
Voluptuous Bulldog Beauties (VBB)-Women's Plus Size Organization, and Dance Team
AAMU Southern Belles

The Collegiate 100 Black Men Of America
Student Government Association
AAMU Democrats
AAMU University Choir
M.A.N.U.P "Men of America Nurturing and Ushering Progress"
Marketing Club
Math Club
MBA Association
Poetry Club
Ward Modeling Troop, Incorporated
House Arrest Two Championship Dance Team Incorporated
Trendsetters Fashion Club
Alima Dance Company
Student Health Alliance
P.O.W.E.R.(Placing Opportunities Within Everyone's Reach) Mentor Program
Forestry club/ Fire dawgs

Alabama A&M University Choir
The Alabama A&M University Choir became the first choir from a historically black college and university to be invited to attend the American Choral Festival in Germany. On Thursday, January 21, 2010, the choir performed a concert at the Alabama Music Educators Association Annual Conference. This was a historical event because the choir was the first choir from a historically black college and university in the state to perform at that conference. In 2014, the choir was invited by the Distinguished Concerts International of New York to be presented in concert at the Lincoln Center in New York City.

Athletics

Alabama A&M's sports teams participate in NCAA Division I (Football Championship Subdivision, formerly I-AA for football) in the Southwestern Athletic Conference (SWAC). Alabama A&M's colors are maroon and white and their mascot is the Bulldog. The Alabama A&M Department of Athletics sponsors men's intercollegiate basketball, football, baseball, cross country, golf, tennis and track & field along with women's intercollegiate tennis, basketball, soccer, track, cross country, bowling, volleyball and softball. Also offered are men's and women's swimming clubs. The football team's home games are played at Louis Crews Stadium. Both men's and women's basketball home games are played in Elmore Gymnasium, affectionately known by fans as "The Dog House." Prior to joining the SWAC, Alabama A&M competed in the NCAA Division II Southern Intercollegiate Athletic Conference from 1941 to 1998. While in the SIAC, Alabama A&M won 11 conference championships in women's volleyball, seven conference championships in football, seven in cross-country, nine in men's basketball, two in women's basketball, and two in baseball.

Notable athletes include Pro Football Hall of Famer and 4-time Super Bowl Champion John Stallworth, NFL Pro Bowler and Super Bowl Champion Robert Mathis, two-time NFL Pro Bowler Howard Ballard, Olympic Gold Medalist Jearl Miles Clark, Andre Brick Haley, Desmond Cambridge, Obie Trotter, and Mickell Gladness. Cambridge currently holds the NCAA single season steals record. Trotter is 4th all-time single season steals, and Gladness is 2nd all-time in blocks in a season. Gladness set an NCAA Division I single game record with 16 blocks against Texas Southern on February 24, 2007. No other player in Division I history has even recorded 15 blocks in a single game.

Media
Alabama A&M University is the licensee for National Public Radio affiliate station WJAB 90.9, which operates 24 hours a day, seven days a week on campus. WJAB airs various public affairs programming, as well as live coverage of Bulldog athletic events.

Notable people

See also

 List of land-grant universities
 List of forestry universities and colleges
 List of agricultural universities and colleges
 List of engineering schools
 List of systems engineering universities
 List of business schools in the United States
 Alabama Cooperative Extension System
 Magic City Classic
 WJAB 90.9 FM Radio

References

Further reading
 Morrison, Richard David. History of Alabama Agricultural and Mechanical University: 1875–1992. Huntsville, Ala. : Liberal Arts Press, c1994.
 
 
 
 Saintjones, Jerome. (2011) Normal Index Online. Alabama A&M University. Normal, AL.

External links

 

 
National Register of Historic Places in Huntsville, Alabama
Historically black universities and colleges in the United States
Land-grant universities and colleges
Alabama AandM University
Universities and colleges accredited by the Southern Association of Colleges and Schools
Educational institutions established in 1875
Universities and colleges in Huntsville, Alabama
African-American history of Alabama
Properties on the Alabama Register of Landmarks and Heritage
1875 establishments in Alabama
Historic districts in Huntsville, Alabama
Historically segregated African-American schools in Alabama
Public universities and colleges in Alabama